Alf Andersen (5 April 1891 – 18 February 1928) was a Norwegian footballer. He played in one match for the Norway national football team in 1913.

References

External links
 
 

1891 births
1928 deaths
Norwegian footballers
Norway international footballers
Association football defenders
IF Fram Larvik players